Redshift is a phenomenon in physics, especially astrophysics

Redshift or red shift may also refer to:

Literature
 Red Shift (novel), a 1973 novel by Alan Garner
 Red Shift (comics), a character in the Marvel Comics universe

Music
 Redshift (group), an English electronic music group
 The Redshift, an album by Omnium Gatherum
 "Redshift" (Enter Shikari song)

Science and technology
 Red Shift Ltd, a video game publisher
 Amazon Redshift, a cloud-based service
 Redshift (renderer), a rendering engine (GPU-accelerated) for Cinema 4D
 Redshift (software), a computer display utility program
 Redshift (theory), an economic theory about information technology markets